A word processor program is a computer program that provides word processing functions. Originally a separate type of application to desktop publishing, the two program types now overlap, with many word processors now including what were once desktop publishing functions.

History 

The first known electronic word processor program was Electric Pencil, released in 1976, as a tool for programmers to write documentation and manuals for their code. Electric pencil featured basic formatting and navigation, and supported external devices such as cassette recorders and printers. Electric Pencil II was released shortly after, targeting the CP/M operating system. Several other word processing programs were released shortly after, including EasyWriter and WordStar.

WordStar was created in four months by Seymour Rubinstein after founding MicroPro International in 1978. WordStar is commonly attributed as the first WYSIWYG (what you see is what you get) editor, as the WordStar editor replicated the printed output. Inspired by the success of WordStar, many competitors began to release their offerings, including WordPerfect in 1979, MultiMate in 1982, and Microsoft Word in 1983.

List of word processors 

Notable programs include:
 Electric Pencil (1976)
 WordStar (1978)
 WordPerfect (1979)
 EasyWriter (1979)
 IBM DisplayWrite (1981)
 MultiMate (1982)
 Volkswriter (1982)
 Microsoft Word (1983)
 Lotus Manuscript (1986)
 TextMaker (1987)
 Sprint (word processor) (1987)
 IBM Lotus Word Pro (1988)
 InPage (1994)
 WordPad (1995)
 TextEdit (1996)
 Ability Write (1996)
 KWord (1998)
 AbiWord (1998)
 Adobe InCopy (1999)
 Atlantis Word Processor (2000)
 Jarte (2001)
 Pages (2005)
 JWPce (2005)
 Google Docs (2006)
 Scrivener (software) (2007)
 WordGrinder (2007)
 PolyEdit (2010)
 LibreOffice Writer (2011)
 Apache OpenOffice Writer (2012)
 Calligra Words (2012)

A word processing function is an essential part of any office suite, and may be provided as a stand-alone program (for example Word in Microsoft Office) or as a function of a more general program (for example LibreOffice Writer in LibreOffice) or other (for example 
TextMaker in SoftMaker). With the emergence of the internet, different cloud-based word processor programs began to emerge, which allow people to work faster and more efficiently.

See also

 Word processor
 Word processor (electronic device)

References

External links

Word processors